This is a list of submissions to the 89th Academy Awards for Best Foreign Language Film. The Academy of Motion Picture Arts and Sciences (AMPAS) has invited the film industries of various countries to submit their best film for the Academy Award for Best Foreign Language Film every year since the award was created in 1956. The award is presented annually by the Academy to a feature-length motion picture produced outside the United States that contains primarily non-English dialogue. The Foreign Language Film Award Committee oversees the process and reviews all the submitted films.

The submitted motion pictures must be first released theatrically in their respective countries between 1 October 2015 and 30 September 2016.

The deadline for submissions was 3 October 2016, with the Academy announcing a list of eligible films on 11 October. A record total of 89 countries submitted a film before the deadline and 85 were accepted. Yemen submitted a film for the first time with I Am Nojoom, Age 10 and Divorced, directed by Khadija al-Salami.

Nine finalists from among the dozens of entries were shortlisted on 15 December 2016, with the final five nominees announced on 24 January 2017. Asghar Farhadi of Iran won the award for The Salesman at the Oscar ceremony on 26 February 2017, his second win after A Separation (2011). He did not attend the ceremony to accept the award in protest of new U.S. travel policies.

Submissions

Notes
  Afghanistan's submission Parting was not included on the list of eligible contenders announced by the Academy.
  Armenia's submission Earthquake was disqualified for not meeting the submission requirements.
  Austria's submission Stefan Zweig: Farewell to Europe was reportedly rejected by the Academy for not being an Austrian film. The film was ultimately included on the list of eligible contenders announced by the Academy.
  Brazil had three films withdrawn from consideration; Neon Bull, Don't Call Me Son and To My Beloved. This was in protest of the appointment of Marcos Petrucelli as a member of the committee, due to his pre-established criticism of Aquarius after the cast and crew of the film protested in Cannes against the Impeachment of Dilma Rousseff. Although Aquarius was seen as the front-runner, it was not chosen by the committee, generating disapproval and more controversy over the relations between the film and Brazil's new government.
  Cameroon's submission Yahan Ameena Bikti Hai was not included on the list of eligible contenders announced by the Academy.
  Tunisia's submission was originally reported to be The Flower of Aleppo directed by Ridha Behi. However, this was later changed to As I Open My Eyes directed by Leyla Bouzid. Neither film was included on the list of eligible contenders announced by the Academy.

References

External links
 Official website of the Academy Awards

2015 in film
2016 in film
89